The men's 1500 metres event at the 2011 Summer Universiade was held on 16–18 August.

Medalists

Results

Heats
Qualification: First 3 in each heat (Q) and the next 3 fastest (q) qualified for the final.

Final

References
Heats results
Final results

1500
2011